V. officinalis may refer to:
 Verbena officinalis, a perennial herb species native to Europe
 Veronica officinalis, a plant species native to Europe and western Asia

See also
 Officinalis